is a former Japanese football player.

Club statistics

National team statistics

Appearances in major competitions

References

External links

1989 births
Living people
Association football people from Kyoto Prefecture
Japanese footballers
J2 League players
J3 League players
Japan Football League players
Cerezo Osaka players
Mito HollyHock players
Fagiano Okayama players
Roasso Kumamoto players
FC Machida Zelvia players
Association football forwards